Leticia Boscacci (born 8 November 1985) is an Argentine volleyball player who participated with the Argentina national team at the Pan-American Volleyball Cup (in 2005, 2006, 2007, 2008, 2009, 2010, 2011, 2012, 2013, 2014, 2015), the FIVB Volleyball World Grand Prix (in 2011, 2012, 2013, 2014, 2015, 2016), the FIVB Volleyball Women's World Cup (in 2011, 2015), the 2014 FIVB Volleyball Women's World Championship in Italy, the 2015 Pan American Games in Canada, and the 2016 Summer Olympics in Brazil.

At club level, she played for Alianza Jesús María, General Paz Juniors, Olímpico de Freyre, Banco Nación, Ícaro Alaró, CDU Granada, Haro Rioja, SES Calais, Cuesta Piedra, Volley Soverato, Olympiacos, Kanti and Alba Blaj before moving to Dinamo București in 2016.

Clubs
  Alianza Jesús María
  General Paz Juniors (2002–2004)
  Olimpico Freyre (2004–2005)
  Club Banco Nación (2005–2006)
  Ícaro Alaró (2006–2007)
  CDU Granada (2007–2008)
  CV Haro (2008–2009)
  Stella Étoile Sportive Calais (2009–2010)
  CV Cuesta Piedra (2010–2011)
  Volley Soverato (2011–2014)
  Olympiacos Piraeus (2014–2015)
  VC Kanti Shaffhausen (2015–2015)
  CS Volei Alba-Blaj (2015–2016)
  CS Dinamo București (2016–present)

References

External links
 Profile at CEV
 Profile  at Lega Pallavolo Serie A Femminile (Italian Serie A)
 Profile  at Ligue Nationale de Volley (LNV)

1985 births
Living people
Argentine women's volleyball players
Sportspeople from Córdoba Province, Argentina
Volleyball players at the 2015 Pan American Games
Pan American Games competitors for Argentina
Olympic volleyball players of Argentina
Volleyball players at the 2016 Summer Olympics
Opposite hitters
Expatriate volleyball players in Spain
Expatriate volleyball players in France
Expatriate volleyball players in Italy
Expatriate volleyball players in Greece
Expatriate volleyball players in Switzerland
Expatriate volleyball players in Romania
Argentine expatriate sportspeople in Spain
Argentine expatriate sportspeople in France
Argentine expatriate sportspeople in Italy
Argentine expatriate sportspeople in Greece
Argentine expatriate sportspeople in Switzerland
Argentine expatriate sportspeople in Romania